1st TV is an independent television station based in South Africa broadcasting to Zimbabwe on free-to-air satellite and on the Internet.
The station was launched in the run-up to the 2013 Zimbabwean general election. It was shut down on 27 September 2013 due to financial resources.

References

Television stations in South Africa
Television channels and stations established in 2013
Television channels and stations disestablished in 2013
Television in Zimbabwe
Defunct mass media in South Africa
Defunct mass media in Zimbabwe